Hangfachang is a metro station on Line 2 of the Hangzhou Metro in China. It is located in the Xiaoshan District of Hangzhou. This station has four exits.

References

Railway stations in Zhejiang
Railway stations in China opened in 2014
Hangzhou Metro stations